"Powderworks" is a song by Midnight Oil released in November 1978 on their eponymous debut album via their own label, Powderworks Records.

Lyrics
The title, which is an Australian term for a munitions factory, can be seen as a way to describe the band's sound; fast and explosive, clearly a more-than-accurate description of this song, particularly in live performances. Powderworks is also the name of a record label, which the group established in 1978.

The song is one of the band's earliest lyrical protests, targeting lying politicians and is narrated by someone who has dealt with enough of the politicians' nonsense.

Reception 
Australian musicologist, Ian McFarlane, described the album, "Only a handful of tracks such as 'Powderworks', 'Used and Abused' and the single 'Run by Night' (December 1978) revealed any promise." "Powderworks" was not released as a single, and despite this is regarded rather highly by fans of the band and early on, became a very important part of the band's live performances. Unlike other songs from the album - "Used and Abused," "Surfing with a Spoon," and "Run by Night" - which were often performed live in the band's early touring, which was a place chosen to road-test the songs from Head Injuries, such as "No Reaction" and "Koala Sprint," this song persevered and was played in live shows up until at least 1982.

Live versions
Currently, only one official live version has been released; this version is available on both Saturday Evening at the Capitol and Scream in Blue. This version omits the third verse and is considerably faster-moving than the original studio version. The song may have appeared on the chocolate wheel for the Redneck Wonderland tour, as did other tracks from this album.

Compilations
While this song was popular with fans, it appeared on neither of the band's two compilations, 20,000 Watt R.S.L. or Flat Chat. It did appear on The Green Disc, however.

References

Midnight Oil songs
1978 songs
Songs written by Rob Hirst
Songs written by Jim Moginie
Songs written by Martin Rotsey
Songs written by Bones Hillman